AmbaCoin is the official cryptocurrency of Ambazonia. It is said to be backed by the "rich natural resources" of the breakaway region. The AmbaCoin was launched on in 2018, and the ICO was from December 2018 to 2019. The Ambazonian Government claims that all profits go towards their independence struggle and humanitarian aid.

References 

Cryptocurrency projects